Madelon may refer to:

Given name:
Madelon Baans (born 1977), retired breaststroke swimmer from the Netherlands, competed in three Summer Olympics
Madelon Lubin Finkel, Professor of Professor of Population Health Sciences at Weill Cornell Medical College, New York City
Madelon Hooykaas (born 1942), Dutch video artist, photographer and film maker
Madelon Mason (1921–2011), American former model and pin-up girl
Madelon Pigalle or Madeleine-Élisabeth Pigalle (1751–1827), French painter
Madelon Szekely-Lulofs (1899–1958), Dutch writer and journalist, best known for writing novels set in Indonesia
Madelon Vriesendorp (born 1945), Dutch artist, painter, sculptor and art collector

Surname:
César Madelón (1927–2013), Argentine equestrian
Charlotte Madelon, video game designer based in the Netherlands
Leonardo Madelón (born 1963), Argentine former footballer and current manager

See also
The Sin of Madelon Claudet, 1931 American pre-Code drama film directed by Edgar Selwyn and starring Helen Hayes
Saint-Cirq-Madelon, commune in the Lot department in south-western France
La Madelon or Quand Madelon, also known in English as Madelon (I'll Be True to the Whole Regiment) is a French popular song of World War I
 Madelon (film), a 1955 French film directed by Jean Boyer
Madaillan
Madalaine
Madalan
Madalena (disambiguation)
Madaline (disambiguation)
Maddalena (disambiguation)
Maddaloni
Madelaine
Madeleine (disambiguation)
Madelena
Madelin
Madeline
Madelyn
Madelyne (disambiguation)
Medalon
Mădălin
Mădălina (disambiguation)

de:Madelon
fr:Madelon
nl:Madelon